Legendia (a.k.a. Silesian Amusement Park) is a permanent amusement park located within Silesian Park in the center of the Upper Silesian Metropolitan Union, Silesia, Poland. It has an area of 26 ha. In 2008, the park saw 253,000 visitors. It is one of the largest permanent amusement parks in Poland.

In 2015, the Slovakian company Tatry Mountain Resorts acquired Silesian Amusement Park. They renamed the park "Legendia" and modified many of its existing attractions. The park is now themed to "Legends".

On July 1, 2017, "Lech Coaster" opened as the largest roller coaster in Central-Eastern Europe.

History 
In 1956, construction of Silesian Amusement Park started. It opened in 1959.

In 1985, a Ferris wheel “Gwiazda Duża” was installed (now Legendia Flower).

In 2013, 26 rides were bought from Denmark's Sommerland Syd.

In 2015, Tatra Mountain Resort became a new investor in Silesian Amusement Park. It planned to invest 117 million of Polish Zloty into the park.

In 2016, the park announced a new roller coaster: "Lech Coaster" that would be 40 meters high. Opening was planned for 2017.

In 2017, because of change of layout and attractions, park changed name to Legendia Śląskie Wesołe Miasteczko.

On July 1, 2017, Lech Coaster - the highest, longest and fastest roller coaster in Poland - was opened. Hyperion has since broken these records

Attractions 
As of 2017 Legendia has about 40 attractions.

External links

 Website of Silesian Amusement Park

Amusement parks in Poland
1959 establishments in Poland
Parks in Katowice
Buildings and structures in Katowice
Tourist attractions in Silesian Voivodeship
Amusement parks opened in 1959